All Saints Church is a local church in Tybee Island, Georgia, itself in the Episcopal Diocese of Georgia.

History 
Early Episcopalian congregants originally met on Tybee Island's Methodist church. However, a new site was needed after the church was destroyed by a hurricane in 1948. The clergy chose to meet in the town's city hall.

City hall was used until 1957, when it was decided that a more permanent site was needed. In 1958, land and funds to build the church were donated, and construction began soon after. Construction ended in 1959, and the church was officially blessed.

Other features were soon added to the church, including its stained glass windows in 1990, its Mission Hall in 1998, and its garden in 2000.

Ministries 
Currently, the All Saints Church runs three ministries: Family Promise, Fresh Air Home, and Nursing Home Christmas. They are dedicated to alleviating homelessness, developing character in children, and celebrating Christmas at the local nursing homes, respectively.

References

Buildings and structures in Chatham County, Georgia
Churches completed in 1959